Hari Krishan Dua (born 1 July 1937) is an Indian journalist, diplomat, and nominated member of the Rajya Sabha.

Dua was the editor of the Hindustan Times from 1987–94, editor-in-chief of The Indian Express from 1994–96, and editor of The Tribune from 2003–09. During his time at the Indian Express, Dua was adjudged the 'media person for 1994' by India Media, an organization to promote mass communication. From  to  he served as India's Ambassador to Denmark. From February 2008 to November 2009 he was member of the National Security Council.

Dua was awarded the Padma Bhushan in 1998. He was nominated by the UPA Government to the Rajya Sabha in November 2009, with his term expiring in November 2015.

References

Living people
1937 births
People from Sargodha
Hindustan Times journalists
Ambassadors of India to Denmark
Recipients of the Padma Bhushan in literature & education
Nominated members of the Rajya Sabha